This is a list of active and extinct volcanoes in Ecuador.

In Ecuador, EPN monitors the volcanic activity in this Andean nation.

Mainland

Galápagos Islands

References 

 Volcano page, Institut for Geophysics, Ecuador (Spanish)

Specific

 
Volcanoes
Ecuador
.